The Wig is 2005 South Korean horror film directed by Won Shin-yun, and starring Chae Min-seo and Yoo Sun. It was first released on August 12, 2005, in South Korea and was released onto DVD in the United States in 2008.

Plot 
A young woman named Soo-hyeon (Chae Min-seo) is struggling against cancer and her older sister Ji-hyeon (Yoo Sun) decides that she should take her home so that she can enjoy what little time she has left rather than spend it in a hospital. Ji-hyeon is mute, because of a car accident that impaled her throat. She buys a long-haired wig for her sister so that she can go out without feeling ashamed of being bald; Soo-hyeon is very happy with the gift and wears it constantly: she begins to look and act healthier and more attractive, and leaves the house often.

Soon, however, Soo-hyeon begins to become a vainer girl with an obsession for the wig and begins to try and steal Ji-hyeon's boyfriend. He breaks up with Ji-hyeon but is not interested in Soo-hyeon. One day, one of Ji-hyeon's friends finds out that her husband is cheating on her. Soo-hyeon lends her wig, saying that she will feel prettier and better. The next day however, the friend is found dead with her husband, covered in hair. Soo-hyeon's wig returns to her, mysteriously. She cruelly ignores Ji-hyeon at all conversation attempts and is plagued with frightening images of the friend's demise. The next day, she tries to have sex with Ji-hyeon's ex, but Ji-hyeon picks her up and the two drive home. Soo-hyeon goads her, angering Ji-hyeon.

At home, the two don't speak until Soo-hyeon washes the wig and Ji-hyeon sees a ghost in it, revealing that the wig is cursed and is corrupting and possessing Soo-hyeon. Ji-hyeon grabs the wig and locks Soo-hyeon in her room, then cuts the wig to shreds. The cancer comes back stronger than ever and Soo-hyeon has to go back to the hospital, unhappy and refusing to see her sister. She escapes the hospital after not taking her medication. We then see a disturbing scene of Soo-hyeon pulling pills from her bloody scalp.

It is revealed that the wig belonged to a man who was in a romantic relationship with Ji-hyeon's ex. Being gay, he was shunned by Ji-hyeon's ex and beaten by a group of teens, cutting his long hair. He then committed suicide. The ghost of the man is the one who is corrupting and possessing Soo-hyeon, who tracks down Ji-hyeon's ex, and the two then reconcile. As they kiss, Soo-hyeon's hair grows at an impossibly fast rate. Ji-hyeon appears and sets fire to the long hair, freeing her sister and destroying the ghost. Unfortunately, she hallucinates that the ghost is in the place of her sister and beats her to death. As Soo-hyeon dies, her sister realizes it was a hallucination and cries at what she has done. The film ends with a photograph of the two girls as children, before Soo-hyeon's cancer and Ji-hyeon's speech loss.

Cast 
 Chae Min-seo as Soo-hyeon / Hee-jo
 Kim Kyeong-in as young Soo-hyeon
 Yoo Sun as Ji-hyeon
 Jeon Ha-eun as young Ji-hyeon
 Bang Moon-soo as Ki-seok
 Sa Hyeon-jin as Kyeong-joo
 Soy as Hye-yeong
 Shin Hyeong-jong as father of Hye-yeong
 Seo Joo-seong as husband of Kyeong-joo
 Na Hyeon-joo as Min-joo
 Ryoo Hyeon-min as Tae-joon
 Kim Joo-kyeong as Ki-hoon

Reception
Critical reception for The Wig has been mixed. DVD Talk and Shock Till You Drop were both relatively ambivalent in their reviews, as both felt that the movie wasn't the best that Asian horror had to offer but still had some viewing value to it that people would enjoy. Bloody Disgusting echoed these sentiments, as they felt that the movie "requires a lot of commitment on the part of the viewer" but that the payoff was "worth it, because as strange as it is, you might not have seen anything quite like it before."

Trivia
Chae Min-seo actually shaved her head for the movie.

References

External links 
 
 
 
 

2005 horror films
South Korean horror films
South Korean supernatural horror films
Films directed by Won Shin-yun
2000s Korean-language films
South Korean LGBT-related films
LGBT-related horror films
2005 films
Works by Do Hyun-jung
2005 directorial debut films
2005 LGBT-related films
2000s South Korean films